Claire Sutherland may refer to:

Claire Sutherland, character in Altars of Desire
Claire Sutherland, editor of mX (newspaper)